Science Court (retitled Squigglevision in 1998) is an educational entertainment, animation/non-traditional court show from Tom Snyder Productions, which was aired on ABC's Disney's One Saturday Morning block from 1997 to 2000. The cartoon was "filmed" in Squigglevision.

Development 
Science Court utilized the limited-animation Squigglevision as its style of animation. In 1998, Science Court was renamed to Squigglevision in its second to third seasons. Tom Snyder Productions has released twelve of the episodes into a series of educational CD-ROMs with accompanying workbooks and experiment kits for schools. On December 2, 2004, Snyder, founder and former CEO of Tom Snyder Productions, was inducted into the Association of Educational Publishers Hall of Fame to honor his extraordinary contribution to educational publishing.

Plot and characters 
The half-hour program mixed courtroom drama, science experiments, and humor to teach fundamental concepts in elementary and middle school science such as the water cycle, work, matter, gravity, flight, and energy. As each case unfolded, the characters in the trial used humor to highlight scientific misconceptions and model good scientific practice. In a typical episode, a lawsuit or criminal action would take place based around some scientific point. Humor and  musical numbers were used to break down scientific concepts.

The primary characters of Science Court were the trial lawyers Alison Krempel and Doug Savage. Alison Krempel, voiced by Paula Plum, was modest, intelligent and kind. Her logical and articulate arguments always lead to the explanations of the scientific points. Doug Savage, voiced by Bill Braudis, was ignorant, arrogant and unscrupulous.

Both Doug and Allison called on a variety of expert witnesses to prove their case. Doug, often to his detriment, called upon child academics Dr. Julie Bean and Dr. Henry Fullerghast to testify. Their scientific testimony usually disproved Doug’s case. Professor Nick Parsons, voiced by H. Jon Benjamin served as an expert for Alison Krempel. He used science to successfully refute Doug Savage's ludicrous and ill-informed claims.  Often Micaela and Tim, Miss Krempel's assistant, helped to break down scientific concepts. Comedians Paula Poundstone and Fred Stoller rounded out the cast playing Judge Stone and court stenographer Fred respectively.

Paula Plum as Alison Krempel
Bill Braudis as Doug Savage
H. Jon Benjamin as Prof. Nick Parsons
Paula Poundstone as Judge Stone
Fred Stoller as Stenographer Fred

Episodes

Series overview

Season 1 (1997–98)

Season 2 (1998–99)

Season 3 (1999–2000)

Critical reception 
Science Court earned top television awards for Tom Snyder.

Variety thought that the TV series tried too hard to make science entertaining, and that it would come across as too complicated for its target audience.

References

External links 

1997 American television series debuts
2000 American television series endings
1990s American animated television series
2000s American animated television series
American Broadcasting Company original programming
American children's animated education television series
Court shows
English-language television shows
Television series by Soup2Nuts
Television series by Disney–ABC Domestic Television
Science education television series
Television series created by Tom Snyder
ABC Kids (TV programming block)
Squigglevision